The Right to Know or  Tasten in het duister  is a 1996 Dutch film directed by Stephan Brenninkmeijer.

Plot
Isn't it every child's greatest fear? That, one day, you find out that your father and mother are not your real parents at all? Press photographer Nora ten Have is a young, self-reliant woman, who's always believed she's had a happy youth. Until cracks appear in her happy memories. When she finds out that she was adopted when she was three years old, she is suddenly left without the very basis of her existence. This forces her to start searching: for her history, for what happened in the past.... but most of all, "who am I" and "where did I come from".

Cast
Cynthia Abma	... 	Nora ten Have
Hidde Maas	... 	Peter Olaf
Michael van Buuren	... 	Hans
Kees Brusse	... 	Karel ten Have
Ellis van den Brink	... 	Jeanne ten Have
Leslie de Gruyter	... 	Terlingen
Margot van Doorn	... 	Joyce
Mark Rietman	... 	Felix
Margo Dames	... 	Marloes Olaf
Jaak Van Assche	... 	Jules
Gaston van Erven	... 	Doctor Gorter
JanAd Adolfsen	... 	Arno Hofstede
Hedy Wiegner	... 	Annabel
Gerda Van Roshum	... 	Widow of the victim
Sjaan Duinhoven	... 	Heleen Olaf

External links 
 

Dutch thriller drama films
1996 films
1990s Dutch-language films